Caleb Calvert (born October 22, 1996) is an American soccer player who most recently played for Saint Louis FC in the USL Championship.

Early life and education
Caleb attended Serrano High School in Phelan, California.  He had originally committed to playing NCAA Division I collegiate soccer for the University of California, Santa Barbara men's soccer team alongside his Chivas USA Academy teammate Ben Spencer before electing to turn professional.

Career

Professional
On July 5, 2013, Calvert signed a homegrown player contract with Chivas USA, making him the youngest signing in club history.  However, he never got a chance to play for the club as Chivas folded after the 2014 season.

On November 19, 2014, Calvert was selected by the Colorado Rapids in the 2014 MLS Dispersal Draft.  On March 27, 2015, it was announced that Calvert had been sent on loan to USL affiliate club Charlotte Independence.  He made his professional debut that same day in a 3–2 defeat to the Charleston Battery.

References

External links

1996 births
Living people
American soccer players
Chivas USA players
Colorado Rapids players
Charlotte Independence players
Saint Louis FC players
Association football forwards
People from Wrightwood, California
Soccer players from California
Sportspeople from San Bernardino County, California
Major League Soccer players
Homegrown Players (MLS)